Miss Martinique is a French beauty pageant which selects a representative for the Miss France national competition from the overseas region of Martinique. The first Miss Martinique was crowned in 1977, while the pageant has been organized regularly since 1984.

The current Miss Martinique is Axelle René, who was crowned Miss Martinique 2022 on 24 September 2022. No Miss Martinique titleholders have gone on to win Miss France.

Results summary
1st Runner-Up: Véronique Caloc (1997); Morgane Edvige (2015); Floriane Bascou (2021)
2nd Runner-Up: Elsa Victoire (1987)
3rd Runner-Up: Camille René (2012); Axelle René (2022)
5th Runner-Up: Brigitte Matrol (1985); Murielle-Justine Jobello (1994); Charlène Civault (2011)
6th Runner-Up: Vanessa Aimée (2006); Anaïs Corosine (2010)
Top 12/Top 15: Flora Renault (2003); Laure-Anaïs Abidal (2017)

Titleholders

Notes

References

External links

Miss France regional pageants
Beauty pageants in France
Women in Martinique